Nepal has a long postal history.  The modern form of postal service was started by the Rana Prime minister Ranaudip Singh in 1878. He established the first post office which was named Nepal Hulak Ghar. In 1881, the first postal stamp was issued. As of 2020, about 1367 types of postal stamps have been issued. Currently, the postal service is regulated by the Postal act of Nepal. Nepal Post, locally known as Hulak Sewa() or Daak Sewa() under the Ministry of Information and Communications is responsible for the postal service in Nepal.

Pre-stamp era
During the reign of King Prithwi Narayan, 1742—1774, official mail was carried around the kingdom by horse. Nepal's early regular postal service is hard to verify as no records have been located, though 1875 is mentioned by some authors, as a time when government runners began to connect Kathmandu with Gorkha, Pokhara and Palpa. However, Hellrigl & Hepper suggest 1879 because postmark evidence shows that native postmarks were in use, postal routes were extended, mail was accepted from the public and a nucleus of post offices were in operation from that year.

First stamps

The first Nepalese postage stamps were issued in April 1881 as a set of three which were valued at one anna, two annas, and four annas, inscribed as the Kingdom of Gorkha in Nepali script. These were initially perforated and printed on European-made paper. These stamps were printed with the press that Jang Bahadur Rana had brought from England.  Within a few months they were released imperforate. In 1886 they were reprinted on hand-made Nepalese paper. Numerous printings of these first three values on the local paper were made for postal use until 1907, when new European-manufactured stamps picturing the god Pashupati were issued.

The remainders of the first three values were brought out of storage and reissued for telegraph use in 1917. Several more telegraph-era printings followed. The last of these printings was in 1929.

Pashupati issue
Several printings were made of the stamps illustration Pashupati. These were first issued in 1907 and continued until 1935 in several values, colours and values.

Current situation
Currently, Nepal Post which is run by the Postal Services Department of the Nepal under Ministry of Information and Communications operates the postal service in Nepal. It has four central offices in Kathmandu and regional offices in Biratnagar, Pokhara, Surkhet and Doti. Also there are 70 district offices and 842 city post offices and 3074 small post offices. Nepal Post also has participation with the EMS system.

UPU membership
Nepal became a member of the Universal Postal Union (UPU) on 11 October 1956 (Ottawa Congress) which became effective from 14 April 1959.

See also
Nepal and Tibet Philatelic Study Circle
Nepal Post

References and sources
Notes

Sources
Shrestha, Dr. Ramesh. Nepalese Postal History from the earliest times until 1959. Kathmandu, Nepal: Kazi Madhusudan Rajbhandary, 2009.

Further reading

External links

List of Nepali postage stamps.
nepalstamps.com
Nepal and Tibet Philatelic Study Circle.

Philately of Nepal
History of Nepal
1881 establishments in Nepal